Archie Moore (born Archibald Lee Wright; December 13, 1913 – December 9, 1998) was an American professional boxer and the longest reigning World Light Heavyweight Champion of all time (December 1952 – May 1962). He had one of the longest professional careers in the history of the sport, competing from 1935 to 1963. Nicknamed "The Mongoose", and then "The Old Mongoose" in the latter half of his career, Moore was a highly strategic and defensive boxer. As of December 2020, BoxRec ranks Moore as the third greatest pound-for-pound boxer of all time. He also ranks fourth on The Rings list of "100 greatest punchers of all time". Moore was also a trainer for a short time after retirement, training Muhammad Ali, George Foreman and James Tillis.

A native of Benoit, Mississippi, Moore was raised in St. Louis, Missouri, and grew up in poverty. Moore was denied a shot at the world title for 15 years, and spent many of those years fighting on the road with little to show for it. An important figure in the American Black community, he became involved in African American causes once his days as a fighter were over. He also established himself as a successful character actor in television and film. Moore died in his adopted home of San Diego, California; he was 84 years old.

Early life
Born Archibald Lee Wright, the son of Thomas Wright, a farm laborer and drifter, and Lorena Wright. He always insisted that he was born in 1916 in Collinsville, Illinois, his mother told reporters that he was actually born in 1913 in Benoit, Mississippi. His father abandoned the family when Archie was an infant. Unable to provide for him and his older sister, his mother gave them into the care of an uncle and aunt, Cleveland and Willie Pearl Moore, who lived in St. Louis. Archie later explained why he was given their surname: "It was less questions to be called Moore."

He attended segregated all-Black schools in St. Louis, including Lincoln High School, although he never graduated. His uncle and aunt provided him with a stable upbringing, but after his uncle died in a freak accident around 1928, Moore began running with a street gang. One of his first thefts was a pair of oil lamps from his home, which he sold so that he would have money to buy boxing gloves. He later recalled of his stealing: "It was inevitable that I would be caught. I think I knew this even before I started, but somehow the urge to have a few cents in my pocket made me overlook this eventuality". After he was arrested for attempting to steal change from a motorman's box on a streetcar, he was sentenced to a three-year term at a reform school in Booneville, Missouri. He was released early from the school for good behavior after serving twenty-two months.

Around 1933 Moore joined the Civilian Conservation Corps, working for the forestry division at a camp in Poplar Bluff, Missouri. Determined to become a boxer, he decided to make his work at the camp a form of training. He later recalled that the other boys constantly kidded him about one daily exercise—standing upright in the bed of a truck as it drove along primitive forest roads, waiting until the last possible moment before ducking or weaving away from tree branches.

Boxing career 

The captain of the camp permitted him to organize a boxing team, which competed in Golden Gloves tournaments in southern Missouri and Illinois. Many of his fights occurred in a racially charged atmosphere; he later described one of them, against a white boxer named Bill Richardson in Poplar Bluff:I knocked him down with a volley of head punches about one minute into round one. His brother ... was the referee. He was furious at me and told me to keep my punches up. Since I had been hitting Bill in the head I would have missed him altogether if I threw my punches any higher. But the referee said I had fouled him. ... I got steamed at this and offered to fight [the referee], too. I resolved not to hit Bill any place but his head. ... In the second round I dropped him with a left hook that spun his head like a top. ... I heard a man at ringside say, "For two cents I'd shoot that nigger."

First retirement and comeback

Moore had four fights in 1941, during which he went 2–1–1, with the draw against Eddie Booker. By then, however, he had suffered through several stomach ulcers and the resulting operations, and had announced his retirement from boxing.

His retirement was brief. By 1942 he was back in the ring. He won his first six bouts that year, including a second-round knockout of Hogue in a rematch, and a ten-round decision over Jack Chase. He met Booker in a rematch, and reached the same conclusion as their first meeting had: another 10-round draw.

In 1943, Moore fought seven bouts, winning five and losing two. He won and then lost the California State Middleweight title against Chase, both by 15-round decisions, and beat Chase again in his last bout of that year, in a ten-round decision. He also lost a decision to Aaron Wade that year.

The Atlantic Coast

In 1944, he had nine bouts, going 7–2. His last bout that year marked his debut on the Atlantic Coast, and the level of his opposition began to improve. He beat Jimmy Hayden by a knockout in five, lost to future Hall of Famer Charlie Burley by a decision, and to Booker by a knockout in eight.

He won his first eight bouts of 1945, impressing Atlantic coast boxing experts and earning a fight with light heavyweight Jimmy Bivins, a boxer that was not considered a hard puncher, who defeated Moore by a knockout in six at Cleveland. He returned to the Eastern Seaboard to fight five more times before that year was over. He met, among others, light heavyweight Holman Williams during that span, losing a ten-round decision, and knocking him out in eleven in the rematch.

By 1946, Moore had moved to the light heavyweight division and he went 5–2–1 that year, beating contender Curtis Sheppard, but losing to future World Heavyweight Champion and Hall of Famer Ezzard Charles by a decision in ten, and drawing with old nemesis Chase. By then, Moore began complaining publicly that, according to him, none of boxing's world champions would risk their titles fighting him. 1947 was essentially a year of rematches for Moore. He went 7–1 that year, his one loss being to Charles. He beat Chase by a knockout in nine, Sheppard by a decision in ten and Bivins by a knockout in nine. He also defeated Burt Lytell, by a decision in ten.

On June 2nd, 1948, Leonard Morrow (12–2–1) KO’d Archie Moore (92–14–7) in the first round to win the California light heavyweight championship.

Years later when asked about the fight with Morrow, Archie would claim he had accidentally fouled Morrow and reached out his hand as a sign of an apology, but this wasn’t what happened. He had also forgotten he had told the newspapers what had really happened while he was in California before his fight with Bob Dunlap, saying, “I never dreamed this kid could hurt me. I thought I’d spar a bit and see what he had. He hit me hard. I got up and he swarmed all over me. Never was I so humiliated.”

He fought a solid 14 fights in 1948, losing again to Charles by a knockout in nine, losing to Henry Hall by a decision in ten and to Lloyd Gibson by a disqualification in four. But he also beat Ted Lowry, by a decision in ten, and Hall in a rematch, also by decision.

In 1949, he had 13 bouts, going 12–1. He defeated the Alabama Kid twice; by knockout in four and by knockout in three, Bob Satterfield by a knockout in three, Bivins by a knockout in eight, future World Light Heavyweight Champion and IBHOF inductee Harold Johnson by a decision, Bob Sikes by a knockout in three and Phil Muscato by a decision. He lost to Clinton Bacon by a disqualification in six. By Moore's standards, 1950 was a vacation year for him: he only had two fights, winning both, including a 10-round decision in a rematch with Lydell.

In 1951, Moore boxed 18 times, winning 16, losing one, and drawing one. He went on an Argentinian tour, fighting seven times there, winning six and drawing one. In between those seven fights, he found time for a trip to Montevideo, Uruguay, where he defeated Vicente Quiroz by a knockout in six. He knocked out Bivins in nine and split two decisions with Johnson.

World Light Heavyweight Champion

1952 was one of the most important years in Moore's life. After beating Johnson, heavyweight contenders Jimmy Slade, Bob Dunlap, and Clarence Henry and light heavyweight Clinton Bacon (knocked out in four in a rematch), Moore was finally given an opportunity at age 36 (he later learned he was actually nearly 39, his mother confirming he had been born in 1913, not 1916) to fight for the title of World Light Heavyweight Champion against future IBHOF honoree Joey Maxim. Maxim had just defeated the great Sugar Ray Robinson by a technical knockout in 14 rounds, forcing Robinson to quit in his corner due to heat exhaustion. Against Maxim, Moore consistently landed powerful right hands, hurting him several times en route to a fifteen-round decision. After sixteen long years, he had finally achieved his dream. The next year, Moore won all nine of his bouts, including a 10-round, non-title win against then fringe heavyweight contender Nino Valdez of Cuba and a 15-round decision over Maxim in a rematch to retain the belt. He made two more bouts in Argentina before the end of the year.

In 1954, he had only four fights, retaining the title in a third fight with Maxim, who once again went the 15 round distance, and versus Johnson, whom he knocked out in 14. He also beat highly ranked heavyweight Bob Baker. In 1955, Moore again beat Valdez, who by that time was the no. 1 heavyweight contender, and defended against Bobo Olson, the World Middleweight Champion and future Hall of Famer who was coming off a decision victory over Joey Maxim, by a knockout in three.

"The Mongoose" received two cracks at the heavyweight championship of the world. On September 21, 1955, Moore faced future Hall of Famer Rocky Marciano at New York's Yankee Stadium. It was in this fight Archie came closest to wearing the belt. A Moore surprise right hand in the 2nd round sent Marciano down for the second and final time in his career, setting the stage for a legendary battle, but also creating controversy as far as shared memory. In subsequent years Moore made much of Referee Harry Kessler's handling of the pivotal moment. A half-decade on, in Archie's autobiography, The Archie Moore Story (1960), he describes in detail the referee, though Rocky arose at "two", continuing a superfluous mandatory eight-count: "...Kessler went on, three, four. The mandatory count does not apply in championship bouts (1955)...My seconds were screaming for me to finish him and I moved to do so, but Kessler...carefully wiped off Rocky's gloves, giving him another few seconds...he gave him a sort of stiff jerk, which may have helped Rocky clear his head." Moore admits to being angry enough at what he saw as interference, he went recklessly, "blind and stupid with rage", going for the knockout, toe-to-toe. This resentment toward referee Kessler appears only to have grown more entrenched. By the time of a recorded interview with Peter Heller, in October, 1970, Archie had this to say: "(Kessler) had no business refereeing that match because he was too excitable. He didn't know what to do...He grabbed Marciano's gloves and began to wipe Marciano's gloves and look over his shoulder...I'll never forget it. It cost me the heavyweight title."

This grudge, however, was not mutual. In his own autobiography, Harry Kessler indeed recounts Marciano-Moore with a great excitement, frequently employing exclamation marks in his punctuation, going so far as a direct comparison to the donnybrook between Jack Dempsey and Luis Firpo.  Yet, the third man is evenhanded in his praise, taking time over most of a chapter on the bout, to laud Moore. His praise for Moore include the following quotes:
"Archie had exuded a stalwart confidence from his training camp..."
"Archie Moore had more punches in his arsenal than Robin Hood and all his Merry Men had arrows in their quivers..."
"Archie Moore was probably as sure a fighter as ever set foot in the ring..."
"No one ever questioned Archie Moore's courage...".
As for the knockdown, described here also in detail, Kessler offers a perspective directly contradicting Moore's, saying "I didn't bother to wipe Marciano's gloves on my shirt before I waved them back to combat; that early in the drama, there was no resin on the canvas." As opposed to any blind rage, Kessler states that "Archie hesitated a couple of seconds before he came in."  With humor and without malice, Kessler even recounts the 38-year-old Moore poo-pooing any talk of retirement at the postfight press conference, then sitting in on bass fiddle at a hotspot in Greenwich Village until 5 A.M.!

Examination of the original, uncut closed circuit broadcast from 1955, shows no excesses in referee involvement. Marciano arises at "two", but the voice of Al Berl, assigned the counting for knockdowns, continues to "four". In harmony with Archie's further 1960 description, Marciano has moved to the ropes and rests an elbow. Moore is already moving toward him. Kessler flashes onscreen quickly, then away again, as though he had meant to separate the fighters. He is perpendicular to Marciano's chest, and his right hand waves rapidly near Rocky's left glove. Kessler reverses out as fast as he has come into frame, with no wiping of Marciano's gloves, and the action resumes. Marciano recovered, and went on to knock Moore down five times, finally knocking him out in the ninth to retain the belt. It was Marciano's sixth and last title defense, before retiring in 1956.

In 1956, Moore fought mostly as a heavyweight but did retain his Light Heavyweight title with a ten-round knockout over Yolande Pompey in London. He won 11 bouts in a row before challenging again for the World Heavyweight Championship. The title was left vacant by Marciano, but Moore lost to Floyd Patterson by a knockout in five (Patterson, yet another future Hall of Famer, himself made history that night, becoming, at the age of 21, the youngest World Heavyweight Champion yet, a record he would hold until 1986).

Moore won all six of his bouts during 1957. Among those wins was an easy 10-round decision over heavyweight contender Hans Kalbfell in Germany, a knockout in 7 rounds over highly ranked Tony Anthony to retain the light heavyweight title, a one-sided 10-round decision over light heavyweight contender Eddie Cotton in a non-title bout and a 4th-round knockout of future top ten heavyweight contender Roger Rischer.

In 1958, Moore had 10 fights, going 9–0–1 during that span. His fight with Yvon Durelle in particular was of note: defending his world light heavyweight title in Montreal, Quebec, Canada, he was felled three times in round one, and once again in round five, but then dropped Durelle in round 10 and won by a knockout in the 11th. 1959, his last full year as uncontested champion, was another rare low-profile year; in his two fights, he beat Sterling Davis by a knockout in three, and then Durelle again, also by a knockout in three, to once again retain his World Light Heavyweight title.

In 1960, Moore was stripped of his World Light Heavyweight title by the National Boxing Association (NBA), but continued to be recognized by most major boxing authorities including the New York State Athletic Commission and The Ring Magazine. Moore won three of his four bouts in 1960, one by decision against Buddy Turman in Dallas, his lone loss coming in a ten-round decision versus Giulio Rinaldi in Rome. In 1961, he defeated Turman again by decision in Manila, Philippines before defending his Lineal World Light Heavyweight Championship for what would be the last time, beating Rinaldi by a 15-round decision to retain the belt. In his last fight that year, he once again ventured into the heavyweights, and met Pete Rademacher, a man who had made history earlier in his career by becoming the first man ever to challenge for a world title in his first professional bout (when he lost to Patterson by a knockout in six). Moore beat Rademacher by a knockout in nine.

In 1962, the remaining boxing commissions that had continued to back Moore as the World Light Heavyweight Champion withdrew their recognition. He campaigned exclusively as a heavyweight from then on, and beat Alejandro Lavorante by a knockout in 10 and Howard King by a knockout in one round in Tijuana. He then drew against future World Light Heavyweight Champion Willie Pastrano in a 10-round heavyweight contest. On the posters advertising that fight, Moore was billed as the "World Light Heavyweight Champion." The bout took place in California, which had not yet withdrawn recognition from Moore at the time the Moore-Pastrano fight was signed. By the time the bout took place, the California commission, like New York, Massachusetts, the EBU and Ring Magazine, had recognized Harold Johnson, who had beaten Doug Jones 16 days earlier, as the new Light Heavyweight Champion. Johnson had reigned as the NBA (WBA) Champion since February 7, 1961.

Then, in his last fight of note, Moore faced a young heavyweight out of Louisville named Cassius Clay (Muhammad Ali). Moore had been Clay's trainer for a time, but Clay became dissatisfied and left Moore because of Moore's attempts to change his style and his insistence that Clay do dishes and help clean gym floors. In the days before the fight, Clay had rhymed that "Archie Moore...Must fall in four."  Moore replied that he had perfected a new punch for the match: The Lip-Buttoner. Nonetheless, as Clay predicted, Moore was beaten by a knockout in four rounds. Moore is the only man to have faced both Rocky Marciano and Muhammad Ali. After one more fight in 1963, a third-round knockout win over Mike DiBiase in Phoenix, Moore announced his retirement from boxing, for good.

Final retirement

Despite retiring, Moore couldn't escape the limelight, and received numerous awards and dedications. In 1965, he was given the key to the city of San Diego, California. In 1970, he was named "Man of The Year" by Listen Magazine, and received the key to the city of Sandpoint, Idaho. He was elected in 1985 to the St. Louis city Boxing Hall of Fame and he received the Rocky Marciano Memorial Award in the city of New York in 1988. In 1990, he became a member of the International Boxing Hall of Fame in Canastota, New York, being one of the original members of that institution.

At one point the oldest boxer to win the World's Light Heavyweight Championship, he is believed to have been the only boxer who boxed professionally in the eras of Joe Louis, Rocky Marciano and Muhammad Ali. He is one of only a handful of boxers whose careers spanned four decades, retiring with a final record of 185 wins, 23 losses, 11 draws and 1 no contest, with 131 official knockouts.

However, at least three of Moore's 131 knockouts came in less-than-competitive matches against pro wrestlers: "Professor" Roy Shire in 1956, Sterling Davis in 1959 and Mike DiBiase in 1963 (Moore's 131st and final knockout). All three matches are officially listed as third-round TKO stoppages. The second-highest amount of knockouts in boxing history is 128, which belongs to Sam Langford .

During the 1960s he founded an organization called Any Boy Can, which taught boxing to underprivileged youth in the San Diego area. In 1974 he helped train heavyweight boxer George Foreman for his famous "Rumble in the Jungle" title bout in Zaire against Muhammad Ali. In 1976 he served as an assistant coach for the Nigerian Olympic boxing team. Actively involved in efforts to teach children about the dangers of drug abuse, he worked during the 1980s as a youth boxing instructor for the federal Department of Housing and Urban Development, assigned largely to ghettos in San Diego and Los Angeles. "I try to pass on the arts I know: self-control, self-reliance, self-defense," he told a reporter. In the early 1990s he again worked as a trainer for George Foreman.

Acting career
In 1960, Moore was chosen to play the role of the runaway slave Jim in Michael Curtiz's The Adventures of Huckleberry Finn, based on the Mark Twain novel, opposite Eddie Hodges as Huck. Moore garnered positive reviews for his sympathetic portrayal of Jim, which some viewers still consider the best interpretation of this much-filmed role.

Moore did not choose to pursue a full-time career as an actor, but he did appear in films such as The Carpetbaggers (1964), The Hanged Man (1964) and The Fortune Cookie (1966), and on television in episodes of Family Affair, Perry Mason, Wagon Train, The Reporter, Batman (episode 35)  and the soap opera One Life to Live. He also appeared in the critically acclaimed TV movie My Sweet Charlie.  His later film appearances included the crime film The Outfit (1973), as a chef in Breakheart Pass (1975) with Charles Bronson, and a cameo role as himself in the 1982 film Penitentiary II, along with Leon Isaac Kennedy and Mr. T.

Humanitarian
Boxing took Moore all over the world as a fighter, a civil rights activist, and a leader in the fight to influence the minds of the nation's youth. He arrived in Argentina in June 1951 for a rematch with the champion Abel Cestac. Moore's victory made headlines and caught the attention of the Argentinian President Juan Perón and his wife Eva for his selfless act helping children, buying them shoes, clothing, and building their confidence. Moore was invited to stay in Argentina and accept an appointment as the Minister of Welfare of Children. He declined the offer to continue his road to winning title fights.

In 1957, Moore founded Any Boy Can, a non-profit organization based in San Diego, California. ABC, as it was known, provides services to all who seek help regardless of age, race, creed, religion or national origin. Moore stated that the mission of ABC is to help the youth to "step off in life with their best foot forward." The students were taught good sportsmanship, respect, and confidence. They were instructed to look a person in the eye and give them a firm handshake. They addressed him as Instructor Moore.

Word traveled fast about Moore's ABC program. He was invited to Jamaica and sponsored by the Jamaican Boxing Board of Control to train boys for the Olympics. He trained 600 boys using his ABC methods.

In 1968, the ABC Foundation received the Freedom Foundation's Patriotism Award, a special citation for providing a challenge for youth to become contributing members of their communities and upholding the ideals and ideas that were present at the founding of our great nation. This recognition is one of many.

Based on his work with the youth, in 1981, Moore became the Presidential Appointee of Ronald Reagan to work under Samuel R. Pierce, Secretary of Housing and Urban Development (HUD). Under the national heading, Project Build, Moore taught boxing to underprivileged youth in and around the housing projects in California.

Moore applied the philosophy and mechanics of his ABC program and until his death, he believed that "Any Body Can."

Personal life

Archie Moore had three daughters, Reena, J'Marie and Elizabeth Moore-Stump, and four sons, Archie Jr., Hardy, Anthony and D'Angelo.  The marriage of Archie Moore and Elizabeth Thorton produced Archie Jr. and Elizabeth. In 1956, he married Joan Hardy and had five children: Reena, J'Marie, Hardy, Anthony and D'Angelo. They were married until his death in 1998.

Moore joined the Seventh-day Adventist Church later in life.

In 1997, J'Marie Moore became the first daughter of a famous boxer to herself become a professional boxer.

Death
Archie Moore died of heart failure in 1998. He was cremated and is interred in a niche at Cypress View Mausoleum and Crematory, in San Diego.

Filmography

Accolades
In 1965, Moore was also inducted by the San Diego Hall of Champions into the Breitbard Hall of Fame.
In 1980, he was inducted into the World Boxing Hall of Fame. 
In 1990, he was inducted into the International Boxing Hall of Fame. 
In 2002, Archie Moore was inducted into the St. Louis Walk of Fame.
In 2006, Moore was inducted into the California Boxing Hall of Fame.
The Ring ranked Moore #4 on its "Best Punchers of all time" list in 2003 and #14 on its list of the "80 Best Fighters of the Last 80 Years."
Moore was ranked as the #1 light heavyweight of all-time by the International Boxing Research Organization in 2005.
Moore was voted as the #1 light heavyweight of the 20th century by the Associated Press in 1999.
Moore is rated the number sixth pound for pound fighter of all time by Boxrec.

Professional boxing record

See also
List of light heavyweight boxing champions

References

Further reading

External links

Archie Moore – CBZ Profile

1913 births
1998 deaths
African-American boxers
American Seventh-day Adventists
Boxers from San Diego
Boxers from Mississippi
Converts to Adventism
International Boxing Hall of Fame inductees
Light-heavyweight boxers
People from Benoit, Mississippi